Mian Melk (also Romanized as Mīān Melk, Mīān Molk, and, Meyān Molk; also known as Chapak Rūd) is a village in Chapakrud Rural District, Gil Khuran District, Juybar County, Mazandaran Province, Iran. At the 2006 census, its population was 334, in 81 families.

References 

Populated places in Juybar County